Tony Alexander Flygare (born 6 January 1981) is a Swedish former footballer who played as a forward.

Club career 
He started off his career with Malmö FF, playing alongside Zlatan Ibrahimović in both the youth as well as senior teams. During his career he also played abroad, first with SV Wehen Wiesbaden in the 2002–03 Regionalliga Süd, and then with FK Cementarnica 55 in the 2005–06 First Macedonian Football League.

International career 
He made a total of 30 appearances for the Sweden U17 and U19 teams, scoring 17 goals.

References

External links 
 

Living people
Association football forwards
Swedish footballers
Allsvenskan players
Malmö FF players
SV Wehen Wiesbaden players
Expatriate footballers in Germany
FK Cementarnica 55 players
Expatriate footballers in North Macedonia
IFK Luleå players
1981 births
FC Rosengård 1917 players
Footballers from Malmö